Henry Miyamoto Garcia Silva (born 19 March 1999), commonly known as Henry, is a Brazilian footballer who currently plays as a forward for Paulista, on loan from Osasco Audax.

Career statistics

Club

References

1999 births
Living people
Footballers from São Paulo
Brazilian footballers
Association football forwards
Clube Atlético Mineiro players
Grêmio Osasco Audax Esporte Clube players
S.C. Braga players
S.C. Braga B players
Paulista Futebol Clube players
Brazilian expatriate footballers
Brazilian expatriate sportspeople in Portugal
Expatriate footballers in Portugal